Apson Manjate, also known as Sonito is a Mozambican international football player. He plays as a forward for Angolan club Bravos do Maquis, having previously played for Liga Muçulmana, Ferroviário Maputo and Grupo Desportivo Maputo.

He was named in the Mozambique national team for the 2013 COSAFA Cup. He scored in games against  Zambia and Namibia.

International goals 
As of match played 4 June 2016. Mozambique score listed first, score column indicates score after each Manjate goal.

References 

Living people
1985 births
Mozambican footballers
Mozambique international footballers
Mozambican expatriate footballers
GD Maputo players
Clube Ferroviário de Maputo footballers
Expatriate footballers in Angola
Place of birth missing (living people)
Liga Desportiva de Maputo players

Association football forwards
Mozambique A' international footballers
2014 African Nations Championship players